John Mark Alexander Colville, 4th Viscount Colville of Culross QC (19 July 1933 – 8 April 2010) was a British judge and politician. He was one of the 92 hereditary peers elected to remain in the House of Lords after the House of Lords Act 1999.

The son of Charles Colville, 3rd Viscount Colville of Culross, he succeeded to his father's title in 1945, at the age of twelve.

He was educated at Rugby School and New College, Oxford, where he graduated with a Bachelor of Arts in law in 1957, and with a Master of Arts in 1963.

Colville served in the Grenadier Guards, reaching the rank of Lieutenant. Called to the Bar at Lincoln's Inn in 1960, he became a Queen's Counsel in 1978 and a Bencher in 1986.

Between 1980 and 1983, he was the representative of the United Kingdom to the United Nations Commission on Human Rights.  Between 1983 and 1987, Colville was the United Nations special rapporteur on the situation of human rights in Guatemala.  He also served in the British government as chair of the Mental Health Act Commission. He was chairman of the Parole Board for England and Wales from 1988 to 1992, Recorder from 1990 to 1993, and Judge of the South Eastern Circuit from 1993 to 1999. From 1996 to 2000, he was a member of the United Nations Human Rights Committee.  From 2001 he served as Assistant Surveillance Commissioner.

Colville was married twice, first to Mary Elizabeth Webb-Bowen in 1958, and, after being divorced in 1973, to Margaret Birgitta Norton, in the following year. He had four sons, including his heir Charles, by his first wife, and one son by his second wife.

He died at age 76 in 2010. His funeral was held at St Nicholas' Church, West Lexham.

References

External links

1933 births
2010 deaths
People educated at Rugby School
Alumni of New College, Oxford
British King's Counsel
Mark
20th-century English judges
Grenadier Guards officers
Members of Lincoln's Inn
People associated with the University of East Anglia
20th-century King's Counsel
United Nations Human Rights Committee members
Viscounts in the Peerage of the United Kingdom
British officials of the United Nations

Hereditary peers elected under the House of Lords Act 1999